Genero Edgar Espinosa Dorantes (born June 19, 1970 in Pachuca, Hidalgo, Mexico) is a Mexican criminal, who was the 477th fugitive listed on the FBI Ten Most Wanted Fugitives list.

Background
He was wanted by the FBI for his alleged participation in the burning, beating, torture and murder of his four-year-old stepson in Nashville, Tennessee, in February 2003. He was considered armed and extremely dangerous. The FBI offered a reward of up to $100,000 for information leading directly to the arrest of Genero Espinosa Dorantes. On February 25, 2006, he was arrested in Tijuana, Baja California, Mexico. He was sentenced on July 8, 2006 and is currently incarcerated at the Northwest Correctional Complex, which is located in Tiptonville, Tennessee. He will be eligible for parole on December 12, 2064.

References

External links
The Internet Wayback Machine's archive of Genero Espinosa Dorantes' FBI top ten most wanted poster
Genero Espinosa Dorantes' profile on America’s Most Wanted

1970 births
FBI Ten Most Wanted Fugitives
Fugitives
Living people
Mexican emigrants to the United States
Mexican murderers of children
Mexican people convicted of murder
Mexican people imprisoned abroad
Mexican prisoners sentenced to life imprisonment
People convicted of murder by Tennessee
People extradited from Mexico to the United States
People from Pachuca
Prisoners sentenced to life imprisonment by Tennessee